Loukovec is a municipality and village in Mladá Boleslav District in the Central Bohemian Region of the Czech Republic. It has about 400 inhabitants.

History
The first written mention of Loukovec is from 1225.

References

Villages in Mladá Boleslav District